SM U-66 was the lead ship of the Type U-66 submarines or U-boats for the Imperial German Navy during World War I. The submarine had been laid down in Kiel in November 1913 as U-7, the lead ship of the U-7 class for the Austro-Hungarian Navy ( or ). They became convinced after the outbreak of war in August 1914 that none of these submarines could be delivered to the Adriatic via Gibraltar, and sold the entire class, including U-7, to the German Imperial Navy in November 1914.

Under German control, the class became known as the U-66 type and the boats were renumbered; U-7 became U-66, and all were redesigned and reconstructed to German specifications. U-66 was launched in April 1915 and commissioned in July. As completed, she displaced  when surfaced and  submerged.

As a part of the Baltic and IV Flotillas, U-66 sank 25 ships with a combined gross register tonnage of 73,847 in six war patrols. The U-boat also torpedoed and damaged the British cruiser  in August 1916. U-66 left Emden on her seventh patrol on 2 September 1917 for operations in the North Channel. The following day the U-boat reported her position in the North Sea but neither she nor any of her 40-man crew were ever heard from again. A postwar German study offered no explanation for U-66s loss, although British records suggest that she may have struck a mine in the Dogger Bank area.

Design and construction 
After the Austro-Hungarian Navy had competitively evaluated three foreign submarine designs, it selected the Germaniawerft 506d design, also known as the Type UD, for its new U-7 class of five submarines. The Navy ordered five boats on 1 February 1913.

The U-7 class was seen by the Austro-Hungarian Navy as an improved version of its U-3 class, which was also a Germaniawerft design. As designed for the Austro-Hungarian Navy, the boats were to displace  on the surface and  while submerged. The boats were designed with five  torpedo tubes; four located in the bow, one in the stern. The boats' armament was to also include a single /26 deck gun.

U-7 and sister boat  were both laid down on 1 November 1913, the first two boats of the class begun. Their construction was scheduled for completion within 29 to 33 months, but neither U-7 nor any of her sister boats were complete when World War I began in August 1914. Because the boats were under construction at Kiel on the Baltic Sea, the Austrians became convinced that it would be impossible to take delivery: the boats would need to be transferred into the Mediterranean past Gibraltar, a British territory. As a result, U-7 and her four sisters were sold to the Imperial German Navy on 28 November 1914.

U-7 was renumbered by the Germans as U-66 when her class was redesignated as the Type U-66. The torpedo load was increased by a third, from 9 to 12, and the deck gun size was upgraded from the  size originally specified to  SK L/30.

Early career 
U-66 was launched on 22 April 1915. On 23 July, SM U-66 was commissioned into the Imperial German Navy under the command of Kapitänleutnant (Kptlt.) Thorwald von Bothmer, a 31-year-old, thirteen-year veteran of the Imperial German Navy. U-66 was assigned to the Baltic Flotilla on 17 October.

In late September, the British submarine flotilla in the Baltic began a submarine offensive against German ships, intending to deny free passage of cargo, especially iron ore, from neutral Sweden to Germany. In A Naval History of World War I, author Paul G. Halpern reports on part of the German response, which was an experiment involving U-66. The U-boat was towed behind an "innocent-looking vessel" and connected to the host ship by a telephone line in addition to the towline. U-66 was able to cast off at a moment's notice to attack an enemy submarine. Halpern does not report on any encounters by U-66, nor does he provide any insight into the overall effectiveness of the plan. U-66 was not credited with the sinking of any vessels of any kind during this time.

Second German offensive 
Germany began its second submarine offensive against shipping the month after U-66 joined the IV Flotilla. As in the first submarine offensive, U-boats were sent independently around Scotland to patrol the Irish Sea and the western entrance to the English Channel. The first reported activity of U-66 during this campaign reveals that she sank her first ship on 5 April 1916. On that date she was in the vicinity of Fastnet Rock and came upon the 3,890-ton British refrigerated cargo ship Zent headed from Garston to Santa Marta in ballast. U-66 torpedoed Zent  from Fastnet and sank the ship with the loss of 49 crewmen; the master and nine sailors were rescued and landed at Queenstown. Over the next two days, U-66 dispatched two French sailing vessels, the 151-ton Binicaise, and the 397-ton fishing smack Sainte Marie west of the Isles of Scilly. On 8 April, von Bothmer and U-66 sank the Spanish-flagged Santanderino  from Ushant. Santanderino, a 3,346-ton ship built in 1890, was sailing from Liverpool to Havana, and U-66 gave 15 minutes' notice for all the passengers and crew to abandon ship; four drowned during the evacuation. Santanderinos 36 survivors were rescued by a Danish steamer and landed at a port on the Bay of Biscay.

U-66 continued her attacks on merchant shipping on 9 April with the sinking of three ships, the British steamers Eastern City and Glenalmond and the Norwegian ship Sjolyst. The 4,341-ton Eastern City was sailing from Saint-Nazaire to Barry Roads in ballast when she was shelled by U-66 and sent to the bottom  from Ushant; all of her crew survived and were landed by 11 April. U-66s next victim was the 2,888-ton Glenalmond sailing from Bilbao to Clyde laden with iron ore. The 20-year-old Norwegian steamer Sjolyst was sailing in ballast from Nantes to Manchester when U-66 sank her about two nautical miles (four kilometers) from where Glenalmond went down. Sjolysts master and entire crew were picked up by the British steamer Libra and landed at Cardiff.

U-66 finished out her busy month the next day by sinking one British and one Italian ship. Margam Abbey, at 4,471 tons, was the largest ship sunk by U-66 to that time. The Italian freighter Unione was sailing with a load of coal from Clyde for Genoa when U-66 torpedoed her off Land's End. The sinking of Unione, with a tonnage of 2,367, raised U-66s tally for the month of April to nine ships with a combined tonnage of 22,848, all sunk in a six-day span. Near the end of April 1916, Admiral Reinhard Scheer, the new commander-in-chief of the High Seas Fleet (under which U-66s IV Flotilla operated), called off the merchant shipping offensive and ordered all boats at sea to return, and all boats in port to remain there.

Grand Fleet ambushes 
In mid-May 1916, Scheer completed plans to draw out part of the British Grand Fleet. The German High Seas Fleet would sortie for a raid on Sunderland, luring the British fleet across "'nests' of submarines and mine-fields". U-66 was one of nine U-boats that put out to sea beginning on 17 May to scout the central North Sea for signs of the British fleet. All the boats were to remain on station until 1 June and await a coded message which would report the sailing of the British fleet. Unfortunately for the Germans, the British Admiralty had intelligence reports of the departure of the submarines which, coupled with an absence of attacks on shipping, aroused British suspicions.

A delayed departure of the German fleet for its sortie (which had been redirected to the Skagerrak) and the failure of five U-boats, including U-66, to receive the coded message warning of the British advance caused Scheer's anticipated ambush to be a "complete and disappointing failure". Although she had not received the advance warning of the coded message, U-66 was one of the two ambush U-boats that actually saw parts of the British fleet. U-66 was unable to make any attacks on the ships she reported due to the presence of screening vessels. The failure of the submarine ambush to sink any British capital ships allowed the full Grand Fleet to engage the numerically inferior High Seas Fleet in the Battle of Jutland, which took place 31 May – 1 June.

The next mention of U-66 in sources is on 11 August, when she sank Inverdruie, a 613-ton three-masted Norwegian bark.

Later in August, the Germans set up another ambush for the British fleet, when they drew up plans for another High Seas Fleet raid on Sunderland (as had been the original intention in May). The German fleet planned to depart late in the day on 18 August and shell military targets the next morning. U-66 was one of 24 U-boats that formed five lines in the expected paths of any Grand Fleet sorties. The other four Standlinie formed similar lines to the north and south; all were to be in place by 08:00 on 19 August. Once again, British intelligence had given warning of the impending attack and ambush, causing the Grand Fleet to sortie at 16:00 on 18 August, five hours before the German fleet sailed.

Both torpedoes scored hits on Falmouths starboard side, flooding the warship forward and aft. The cruiser's mechanical spaces—located amidships—remained intact and in working order, so she was steered to the Humber with an escort of three destroyers and an armed trawler. U-66 tried repeatedly to deal the stricken cruiser a coup de grâce, but narrowly missed with torpedoes on several further attacks. U-66 broke off her pursuit after two hours, having endured multiple attacks from Falmouths screening destroyers. One depth charge attack blew out all the lights on U-66 and knocked clips off two hatches that caused the boat to flood with a considerable quantity of water before the leaks could be sealed. Falmouth continued under tow at  until she crossed Standlinie II and was attacked and sunk by U-63 around noon the next day.

Records on U-66 next appear in late 1916, when she is reported as one of the U-boat escorts assisting the German merchant raider  into the North Atlantic. Wolf, under the command of Karl August Nerger, began a 15-month raiding voyage on 30 November that took the ship into the Indian and Pacific Oceans before a safe return to Germany. U-66s specific locations for this duty are not reported, but on 11 December she sank a Norwegian steamer and a Swedish sailing ship. The ship and her general cargo, headed from Göteborg to Hull, were sent to the bottom without loss of life, and her crew was safely landed by 14 December. The same day, U-66 also sank the 311-ton Swedish sailing ship Palander off the island of Oxö, near the town of Tornio on the Sweden–Finland border.

Unrestricted submarine warfare 
From the early stages of the war the Royal Navy had blockaded Germany, preventing neutral shipping from reaching German ports. By the time of the so-called "turnip winter" of 1916–17, the blockade had severely limited imports of food and fuel into Germany. Among the results were an increase in infant mortality and as many as 700,000 deaths attributed to starvation or hypothermia during the war. With the blockade having such dire consequences, Kaiser Wilhelm II personally approved a resumption of unrestricted submarine warfare to begin on 1 February 1917 to help force the British to make peace. The new rules of engagement specified that no ship was to be left afloat.

 first victim under the new rules was encountered on 1 March. The Norwegian steamer Gurre, reported as 1,733 tons, was crossing the North Sea while steaming from Narvik and Fredrikshald for Hull with a cargo of iron ore. U-66 torpedoed her at position , sending the doomed Norwegian ship into the murky depths with 20 of her crew. The same day, U-66 encountered another Norwegian cargo ship, the 1,005-ton Livingstone, headed from Skien to Charente with a cargo of ammonium nitrate. Livingstones cargo, used in the making of explosives and munitions, was too valuable to destroy. U-66s captain seized the ship as a prize east of Shetland. Further details of the encounter do not appear in sources, but it is known that the 11-year-old Livingstone not only survived the war, but remained in service under a variety of names until she was scrapped in 1962.

In late March, U-66 sank another two vessels. U-66s torpedo attack was successful, sinking the ship and killing 20 men, including the ship's master. Equipped with an auxiliary triple-expansion steam engine, Neath was the former German bark R. C. Rickmers which had been seized by the Admiralty at Cardiff in August 1914. After U-66 torpedoed Neath at 08:45, the bark, en route from Martinique to Le Havre with a load of sugar, sank in seven minutes. The master of Neath was taken prisoner, but had been released and landed at Queenstown two days later.

During April 1917, German  sank 860,334 tons of Allied and neutral shipping, a monthly total unsurpassed in either of the two world wars.  sole contribution to this figure came when she torpedoed the tanker Powhatan  from North Rona in the Outer Hebrides. The 6,117-ton ship, which was carrying fuel oil from Sabine, Texas to Kirkwall, bested Margam Abbey as U-66s largest ship sunk when she went down with 36 of her crew. As was done with the master of Neath, Powhatans master was taken prisoner aboard .

Although the monthly total of tonnage sunk by all  had peaked in April, the losses were over 600,000 tons in each of May and June. U-66 did not contribute to the May tally but, with her most successful month since April 1916, added to the June figures. Eight crewmen died in the attack; the survivors, who included three Americans, were landed on 9 June.

Two days after the attacks on Amor and Manchester Miller, U-66 attacked two more British steamers. The 4,329-ton Ikalis, carrying wheat from New York to Manchester, was torpedoed and sunk  from Fastnet Rock. Though the ship was damaged, Cranmores crew was able to beach her; the ship was later refloated and re-entered service.

U-66 sank her largest ship, the 6,583-ton British steamer Bay State on 10 June. The Warren Line cargo steamer had departed from Boston (the capital of Massachusetts nicknamed, coincidentally, the "Bay State") with a $2,000,000 war cargo destined for Liverpool. Four days later, U-66 encountered the Norwegian bark Perfect, laden with grain, headed from Bahía Blanca for Copenhagen. Perfect, which had been built in 1877, was dispatched by U-66s deck gun at position , east of Shetland.

On 17 June, Kptlt. von Bothmer was replaced by Kptlt. Gerhard Muhle as commander of the U-boat. U-66 was the first (and ultimately only) U-boat command for the 31-year-old Muhle, who had been a classmate of von Bothmer when both had joined the Kaiserliche Marine in April 1902. On 9 July, U-66 sank her first ship under her new commander, when she sent the Spanish steamer Iparraguirre to the bottom. The 1,161-ton steamer was headed to Santander from Piteå and Bergen with a cargo of pitwood, when U-66 attacked her west of the Orkney Islands.

The freighter—a Prince Line line-mate of Stuart Prince, sunk by U-66 in March—was carrying china clay from Liverpool to Newport News. These two ships were the last sinkings credited to U-66. During six successful patrols, U-66 had sunk 25 ships and seized a 26th as a prize, for a combined total tonnage of 74,852.

U-66 began her seventh and what was to be her final patrol on the morning of 2 September when she departed from Emden destined for operations in the North Channel. Shortly after noon on 3 September, U-66 reported a position in the North Sea that placed her beyond known British minefields, in what was her last known contact. A postwar German study offered no explanation for U-66s loss. British records suggest that U-66 may have either struck a mine in an older minefield in the Dogger Bank area, or that a combination of destroyers, submarines, and anti-submarine net tenders sank U-66 sometime between 1 and 11 October. Author Dwight Messimer discounts this latter theory as not being supported by operational details.

Summary of raiding history

Notes

References

Bibliography 

 
 
 
 
 
 
 
 
 
 
 
  (Vols. 4+5, dealing with 1917+18, are very hard to find: Guildhall Library, London, has them all, also Vol. 1–3 in an English translation: The submarine war against commerce)

External links 
 Photos of cruises of German submarine U-54 in 1916–1918.
 A 44 min. German film from 1917 about a cruise of the German submarine U-35.
 
 Room 40: original documents, photos and maps about World War I German submarine warfare and British Room 40 Intelligence from The National Archives, Kew, Richmond, UK.

German Type U 66 submarines
U-boats commissioned in 1915
Maritime incidents in 1917
U-boats sunk in 1917
World War I submarines of Germany
World War I shipwrecks in the Atlantic Ocean
1915 ships
Ships built in Kiel
Missing U-boats of World War I